Endotricha purpurata is a species of snout moth in the genus Endotricha. It was described by Wang and Li, in 2005, and is known from China (Guizhou).

The wingspan is about 18 mm. The forewings are purple suffused with black. The basal area is brown and the terminal area is reddish purple with black scales. The hindwings are reddish suffused with black and with a whitish yellow band extending from the middle near the costal margin to the middle near the inner margin.

Etymology
The specific name is derived from the Latin purpuratus (meaning purple) and refers to the wing color.

References

Moths described in 2005
Endotrichini